Russianism or Russicism is an influence of the Russian language on other languages. In particular, Russianisms are Russian or Russified words, expressions, or grammar constructs used in Slavic languages, languages of CIS states and languages of the Russian Federation.

However, the scope of the Russian language influence is wider. For example, in Italian Russianisms rank fifth and sixth after Anglicisms, Gallicisms, Germanisms, Hispanisms, and Arabisms.

Classification by Ajduković
Jovan Ajduković reinterprets and innovates the "theory of transfer" of lexical borrowing (е.g., Rudolf Filipović 1986, 1990) and introduces the "theory of approximate copying and activation" of contact-lexemes.

In the "theory of transfer", the concept of Russianism (Russism) in lexicographical sources in the broader sense means (1) an unmotivated or motivated word of Russian origin which has kept a strong formal-semantic connection with the corresponding word in Russian (e.g. Serb. ), (2) an unmotivated or motivated word of Russian origin which has partially or completely lost its formal-semantic connection with the original Russian word owing to adaptation (e.g. Serb. ), (3) an unmotivated or motivated word of non-Russian origin borrowed through Russian (e.g. Serb. ) and (4) an unmotivated or motivated word of Russian or non-Russian origin borrowed into the receiving language through a transmitter language (e.g. Maced. ). For example, the transmitter language in Russian-Macedonian language contacts is Bulgarian or Serbian (Ajduković 2004: 94; 340). 

In the "theory of approximate copying and activation" (so-called "Ajduković's Theory of Contacteme"), the concept of Russianism (Russism) means a word having one or more "independent contactemes", which have arisen under the dominant influence of Russian (e.g. Serb. ). Jovan Ajduković introduce the term "contacteme" for the basic unit of contact on each separate level of language. He distinguish "contact-phoneme", "contact-grapheme", "contacteme in distribution of sounds", "prosodic contacteme", "derivational contacteme", "morphological contacteme", "semantic contacteme", "syntactic contacteme", "stylistic contacteme", "contact-lexeme" and "contact-phraseme" (e.g. Serb. ) (Ajduković 2004: 99; 340) (see also Ajduković's Homepage) .

Russianisms and Russification
In countries that have long been under the influence of the Russian Empire, the Soviet Union, and modern Russia, Russianism is a direct result of Russification, when native words and expressions were replaced with Russian ones. Russianisms are especially frequent in Ukrainian and Belarusian, as the languages are linguistically close to Russian. 

Examples of Russianisms in Ukrainian would be "часи" (časy, "clock") instead of "годинник" (hodynnyk), "ковьор" (kov'or "carpet") instead of "килим" (kylym), "празнувати" (praznuvaty, "to celebrate") instead of "святкувати" (svjatkuvaty), and many others. Examples from Moldavian include "odecolon" and "subotnic".

Use of Russianisms results in creation of Russian-Ukrainian or Russian-Belarusian mixed languages (called surzhyk and trasianka accordingly).

See also
List of English words of Russian origin
Nadsat, a fictional English-language slang with abounding Russianisms.

Notes

References 

 (Abstract) 

Russian language
Transliteration
Types of words
Word coinage